Elizabeth Anne Scherer (born June 4, 1976) is an American lawyer who has served as a judge in the Seventeenth Judicial Circuit Court of Florida since 2012.

She gained national attention in 2022 after being randomly assigned to preside over the trial of Nikolas Cruz, the perpetrator of the 2018 Stoneman Douglas High School shooting in Parkland, Florida, the deadliest high school shooting in United States history as of 2022.

Life and career 
Scherer graduated from Florida State University with a B.A. in English and received a J.D. from the University of Miami School of Law. She is a daughter of William R. Scherer, a private attorney who was part of the legal team representing George W. Bush during the 2000 United States presidential election recount in Florida. Before being appointed as a judge by Governor Rick Scott in 2012, Scherer worked as a prosecutor under state attorney Michael Satz, who would later lead prosecution in the Cruz trial.

Parkland shooter trial 
Judge Scherer had been relatively unknown outside of the Broward County until being assigned to preside over the high-profile case of the Parkland shooter, Nikolas Cruz. Her conduct in the case drew both praise and criticism. She permitted the jury to conduct a walk-through of the school building while also limiting the amount of information public defenders were allowed tell jurors regarding the failures of the federal government agencies in handling Cruz prior to the shooting. During the trial, Scherer engaged in heated exchanges with the defense attorneys, accusing them of turning the trial into a "playground" and disrespecting the court. Video footage of the trial was widely shared on social media.

She refused to step down after the defense had argued that the judge was biased toward their client and was prejudicing the jurors. Following the trial, the Florida Association of Criminal Defense Lawyers sent an official complaint to the Chief Judge of Broward County describing her attitude toward the defense as "hostile and demeaning treatment of defense counsel." Scherer, who was further criticized for sharing hugs with the prosecutors following the case, received support from the victims' families who in an open letter posted on Twitter said that the judge "conducted herself with patience, professionalism, restraint &, when it was all over, compassion."

References 

American women lawyers
Murder trials
Mass shootings in the United States
Florida lawyers
1976 births
Living people